Diego Fernández (1703–1775) was as an Andalucian musical instrument maker at the Spanish court in Madrid. He is known to have supplied harpsichords to Domenico Scarlatti and several of his pupils at court. He built instruments in the Iberian style, somewhat resembling Italian instruments, typically involving Pythagorean string scales and 2×8 foot choirs, but with construction elements more reminiscent of northern building styles, including heavier casing.  He is, however, known to have supplied the famous castrato singer Farinelli with a four choir, five register, double manual harpsichord, operated using pedals and made at the behest of Queen Maria Barbara.

See also
List of historical harpsichord makers

References

1703 births
1775 deaths
Harpsichord makers
People from Andalusia
Spanish musical instrument makers